The Hochschober is the mountain that gives its name to the Schober Group in the High Tauern, although the summit is only the fourth highest in the group. This may have arisen because the north face of the mountain is an impressive sight from Kals.

There is another route of comparable difficulty from the east and along the upper part of the southeastern arête. The latter route may use the Lienzer Hut (1,977 m) as a base. Both routes are waymarked and now generally free of snow in the high summer, unlike earlier years, have easy klettersteig ratings  (I) and are somewhat exposed in places. Another ascent option is the partly waymarked climb from the Schobertörl (2,898 m) along the northeastern arête, crossing the  Kleinschober (3,125 m).

Literature and map 
 Alpin Club Map Sheet 41, 1:25,000 series, Schobergruppe, 
 Richard Goedeke: 3000er in den Nordalpen, Bruckmann, Munich, 2004, 
 Walter Mair: Alpenvereinsführer Schobergruppe. Bergverlag Rudolf Rother, Munich, 1979.

External links 

Alpine three-thousanders
Mountains of the Alps
Mountains of Tyrol (state)
Schober Group
Geography of East Tyrol